Patrick Joseph Brennan (1 March 1924 – 11 January 1991) was an Irish professional footballer who played as a left half in the Football League for Brighton & Hove Albion.

Life and career
Brennan was born in 1924 in Dublin. He came to prominence with League of Ireland club Shelbourne before signing for Brighton & Hove Albion in 1948. He made his Football League Third Division South debut towards the end of the year, and became a regular in 1949–50, but inconsistency cost him his place, and he made just six senior appearances in two years. He spent a season with Yeovil Town before joining Southern League rivals Weymouth, where he made 112 appearances in all competitions. A season with Dover preceded a return to the Brighton area where he was player-coach of Sussex County League side Hove Town and worked as an ambulance officer. Brennan died in Hove in 1991 at the age of 66.

References

1924 births
1991 deaths
Association footballers from Dublin (city)
Republic of Ireland association footballers
Association football wing halves
Shelbourne F.C. players
Brighton & Hove Albion F.C. players
Yeovil Town F.C. players
Weymouth F.C. players
Dover F.C. players
Chester-le-Street Town F.C. players
League of Ireland players
English Football League players
Southern Football League players
Irish expatriate sportspeople in England
Irish expatriate association footballers
Expatriate footballers in England